Safety training provides training for occupational safety and health.

Safety Training may also refer to:
 "Safety Training" (The Office), an episode of the American television series The Office
 "Safety Training" (Superstore), an episode of the American television series Superstore